The Mexico national football team represents Mexico in international football and is governed by the Mexican Football Federation. It competes as a member of CONCACAF.

Mexico has qualified to seventeen World Cups and has qualified consecutively since 1994, making it one of six countries to do so. Mexico played France in the first match of the first World Cup on 13 July 1930. Mexico's best progression in World Cups has been reaching the quarter-finals in both the 1970 and 1986 World Cups, both times as host.

Mexico is historically the most successful national team in the CONCACAF region, having won eleven confederation titles, including eight CONCACAF Gold Cups and three CONCACAF Championships (the precursor to the Gold Cup), as well as two NAFC Championships, one North American Nations Cup, one CONCACAF Cup and two gold medals of the Central American and Caribbean Games. It is one of eight nations to have won two of the three most important football tournaments (the World Cup, Confederations Cup, and Summer Olympics), having won the 1999 FIFA Confederations Cup and the 2012 Summer Olympics. Mexico is also the only team from CONCACAF to have won an official FIFA competition, winning the 1999 FIFA Confederations Cup. Although Mexico is under the jurisdiction of CONCACAF, the national team was regularly invited to compete in the Copa América from 1993 to 2016, finishing runner-up twice – in 1993 and 2001 – and obtaining the third-place medal on three occasions.

History

Early years
Football in Mexico was first organized in the early 20th century by European immigrant groups, notably miners from Cornwall, England, and in later years Spanish exiles fleeing the Spanish Civil War.

Mexico's first match was played against Guatemala, which Mexico won 3–2. A series of international friendlies were played against the national representation of Guatemala on 9, 12 and 16 December 1923. The match on 9 December was played in Parque España which Mexico won 2–1. On 12 December, the match ended in a 2–0 win for Mexico, and the final game of the series ended in a 3–3 draw. The manager for this team was Rafael Garza Gutiérrez.

It would be another four years before the national team would be represented in international friendlies. On 19 June 1927, Mexico faced Spain, drawing 3–3. During this series, the squad also played against the Uruguayan club Nacional de Montevideo, losing 1–3.

Formation

In 1927, the official governing body of football in Mexico was founded. The 1928 Summer Olympics was Mexico's first international tournament, where Mexico lost to Spain 1–7 in the round of 16.

Mexico participated in the 1930 FIFA World Cup in Uruguay, grouped with Argentina, Chile, and France. Mexico took part on the first World Cup match ever, a 4–1 loss to France, with Mexico's first World Cup goal by Juan Carreño. In their second match, Mexico fell to Chile 3–0. Mexico's third match, against Argentina, featured the first penalty of the tournament, scored by Mexico's Manuel Rosas.

Post-WWII

Mexico did not appear again in a FIFA World Cup tournament until the 1950 World Cup. Before 1970, Mexico struggled to make much of an impact in the World Cup. It was by far the strongest team in the North American Football Confederation and its successor, CONCACAF, but found it difficult to compete against European and South American teams.  However, goalkeeper Antonio Carbajal has the distinction of being the first player ever to appear in five consecutive World Cups.

In 1965, Mexico won the 1965 CONCACAF Championship to become continental champions for the first time.

In 1970, Mexico hosted the World Cup and kicked off their campaign with a scoreless draw against the Soviet Union. This was followed by a 4–0 win over El Salvador. Mexico advanced to the next round with a victory against Belgium. At the quarter-finals stage, Mexico was eliminated by Italy, losing 4–1.

Mexico failed to qualify for the 1974 World Cup, but did make it into the 1978 finals. Mexico suffered an early exit after three defeats: 0–6 against West Germany, 1–3 against Tunisia, and 1–3 to Poland. Mexico failed to qualify for the 1982 World Cup.

In 1986, Mexico again hosted the World Cup. Coached by Bora Milutinović, Mexico was placed in Group B where they defeated Belgium 2–1, drew 1–1 with Paraguay, and defeated Iraq 1–0. With this performance, Mexico won the top spot in its group, and advanced to the next round where they defeated Bulgaria 2–0. In the quarter-finals stage, Mexico lost to West Germany 1–4 in a penalty shootout after the match finished 0–0.

1990s
Mexico was disqualified from the 1990 FIFA World Cup (and other international competitions) after using players over the age limit in the qualifying round for the 1989 FIFA World Youth Championship, known as the "Cachirules" scandal. The punishment was applied to all Mexico national representatives of all FIFA-sanctioned tournaments.

In the 1990s, after hiring coach César Luis Menotti, Mexican football began experiencing greater international success. In the 1993 Copa América they finished second, losing to Argentina 2–1 in the final.

At the 1994 FIFA World Cup, Mexico won its group on tiebreakers, emerging from a group composed of Italy, Ireland, and Norway. However, Mexico lost in the second round to Bulgaria on penalty kicks.

At the 1998 FIFA World Cup, Mexico was placed in a group with the Netherlands, South Korea and Belgium. Mexico won their opening fixture 3–1 against South Korea. Mexico tied Belgium 2–2, and against the Netherlands earned another 2–2 draw, qualifying for the round of 16. In that round, Mexico lost 2–1 to Germany.

In 1999, Mexico won its first official FIFA tournament by becoming the first host nation to win the FIFA Confederations Cup. Mexico defeated the United States 1–0 in the semifinals, and 1998 World Cup runners-up Brazil 4–3 in the final.

21st century

2000s
Mexico was placed in Group G at the 2002 World Cup alongside Italy, Croatia, and Ecuador. Mexico started with a 1–0 win over Croatia. In the second match, Mexico earned a 2–1 win over Ecuador. Mexico then achieved a 1–1 draw against Italy. In the round of 16, Mexico played rivals United States, losing 2–0.

Mexico was one of eight seeded teams at the 2006 FIFA World Cup in Germany. Mexico was in Group D with Iran, Angola and Portugal. Mexico won their opening match 3–1 against Iran. In their second match, Mexico played to a 0–0 draw against Angola. Mexico reached the round-of-16, despite losing to Portugal 2–1. Mexico saw another round of 16 loss, this time to Argentina, 2–1. Mexico's coach Ricardo Lavolpe stepped down after the tournament, and was succeeded by Hugo Sánchez.

After losing the final match of the 2007 CONCACAF Gold Cup 1–2 against the United States, Mexico successfully rebounded at the 2007 Copa América. Beginning by beating Brazil 2–0, they then defeated Ecuador and tied with Chile to come first in Group B. In the quarter-finals, Mexico beat Paraguay 6–0, but lost in the semi-finals 3–0 to Argentina. Mexico secured third place against Uruguay, winning 3–1.

In July 2009, Mexico won their fifth Gold Cup, and eighth CONCACAF Championship overall, after beating the United States 5–0 in the final.

2010s

Mexico qualified for the 2010 FIFA World Cup, where they were drawn into Group A alongside host South Africa, France and Uruguay. They drew 1–1 against South Africa, defeated France 2–0, and lost 1–0 to Uruguay, and advanced to the round of 16, where they were eliminated following a 1–3 defeat to Argentina.

The 2011 CONCACAF Gold Cup saw Mexico win their group with three wins and no losses. During the tournament, however, five players tested positive for the banned substance clenbuterol and were suspended from the competition. Mexico beat Guatemala in the quarter-finals 2–1, and beat Honduras 2–0. For the third-straight year, the final would be contested between Mexico and the United States; Mexico won the match 4–2, and qualified for the 2013 FIFA Confederations Cup in Brazil, where they were eliminated at the group stage.

Mexico placed second in their group at the 2013 CONCACAF Gold Cup, and advanced to the semifinals and faced Panama. Mexico lost the match 2–1, their second defeat to Panama in the competition after losing to them in the group stage. The two losses to Panama were the first two times Panama had ever defeated Mexico in a Gold Cup match.

Mexico won only two of ten matches during the fourth round of 2014 World Cup qualifying, but qualified for an intercontinental play-off as the fourth-highest placed team in the CONCACAF region. They defeated New Zealand 9–3 on aggregate to qualify for a sixth consecutive World Cup. The team reached the round of 16 where they were defeated 2–1 by the Netherlands.

At the 2015 CONCACAF Gold Cup, Mexico was drawn into Group C along with Triniad and Tobago, Cuba and Guatemala. The team placed second in the group, and won the quarterfinal match against Costa Rica and semifinal against Panama, both under controversial circumstances. Mexico won the Gold Cup after defeating Jamaica 3–1 in the final. Two days after the final, Miguel Herrera was released as coach of the national team after an alleged physical altercation with TV Azteca announcer Christian Martinoli. On 10 October, Mexico defeated the United States 3–2 to win the inaugural edition of the CONCACAF Cup, thus earning qualification to the 2017 FIFA Confederations Cup in Russia. The following month, Juan Carlos Osorio was hired as Mexico's 16th manager, replacing interim manager Ricardo Ferretti.

Mexico entered the Copa América Centenario, hosted in the United States, on a 13-match unbeaten streak that began in July 2015. El Tri placed first in Group C, winning 3–1 over Uruguay and 2–0 over Jamaica, and drawing 1–1 with Venezuela. In the quarterfinal against Chile in Santa Clara, California, the team lost 7–0, ending the unbeaten streak at 16 after nearly a year. After the match, manager Osorio apologized to Mexico's fans for what he described as an "embarrassment, an accident of football".

At the 2017 Confederations Cup, Mexico was drawn into Group A along with Portugal, New Zealand, and hosts Russia. El Tri advanced as runners-up of the group, and lost 4–1 to Germany in the semi-finals. Mexico finished fourth in the tournament, losing 2–1 to Portugal in the third-place match.

In their opening match of the 2018 FIFA World Cup, Mexico defeated defending champion Germany, thanks to a sole goal from Hirving Lozano, for the first time in a World Cup match. They would go on to defeat South Korea 2–1 in the next game, with goals from Carlos Vela and Javier Hernández, but would fall 3–0 to Sweden in the last group stage match. Despite the loss, Mexico qualified to the round of 16 for the seventh-consecutive tournament. In the round of 16, Mexico was defeated 0–2 by Brazil; the defeat meant that for the seventh tournament in a row, Mexico failed to reach the quarterfinals since they last hosted the World Cup in 1986. On 28 July, Juan Carlos Osorio left as head coach on the expiry of his contract.

In January 2019, Gerardo Martino was appointed as Mexico's new head coach, becoming the third Argentine to coach the national team. In that year's Gold Cup tournament, they won all three group stage matches, defeated Costa Rica in penalties 5–4 following a 1–1 draw in the quarter-final and won against Haiti in the semi-final. Mexico won the Gold Cup after defeating the United States 1–0 in the final.

2020s: 2022 World Cup exit
In 2021, Mexico finished runners-up in the 2021 CONCACAF Nations League Final and the 2021 CONCACAF Gold Cup, both in which Mexico lost to the United States. At the 2022 FIFA World Cup, Mexico finished third in Group C behind Argentina and Poland (due to goal difference), making it the first time since 1978 that Mexico got eliminated in the group stage. Due to the poor performance, head coach Gerardo Martino and Mexico parted ways immediately after elimination (the 1982 and 1990 World Cup tournaments, in which Mexico did not participate, notwithstanding).

Home stadium

The Estadio Azteca, also known in Spanish as "El Coloso de Santa Úrsula", was built in 1966. It is the official home stadium of the Mexico national team, as well as the Mexican club team Club América. It has an official capacity of 87,523, making it the largest football-specific stadium in the Americas and the third largest stadium in the world for that sport. The stadium hosted the FIFA World Cup Final in 1970 and 1986.

Friendly matches hosted by the Mexico national team often take place in stadiums across the United States as well as throughout Mexico, including the Azteca.

Team image

Kit

The Mexico national team traditionally utilizes a tricolor system, composed of green shirts, white shorts and red socks, which originate from the national flag of Mexico, known as the tricolor. Until the mid-1950s, Mexico wore a predominantly maroon kit, with black or dark blue shorts.

In 2015, Adidas released a new all-black color scheme for Mexico's home kit. Green, white and red remain as accent colors.

In 2017, the Mexico national team's jerseys were updated to reflect their Spanish names correctly spelled, with the diacritic mark.

Kit suppliers

Media coverage
All of Mexico's matches are shown live on over-the-air networks Televisa and TV Azteca in Mexico. In the United States all of Mexico's international friendlies and home World Cup qualifiers are shown on Spanish language network Univision while away World Cup qualifiers are shown on Telemundo. On 30 January 2013, English language network ESPN and Univision announced an agreement to telecast the Mexico national team home World Cup qualifiers and international friendly matches in English in the United States.

Supporters

Controversial goal kick chant

Mexico's fans are infamously known for the vulgar, homophobic chant "¡eeeh puto!", which is typically screamed when an opponent's goalkeeper is about to perform a goalkick.

Origins
The origins of the chant is thought to have had developed in the 1980s in Monterrey where in little league American football games, fans would chant "¡eeeh pum!" during the opening kickoff. This chant was not disparagingly used as the word pum  is attributed to an impact of some sort. Though the current incarnation of the chant is widely thought to have originated sometime between 2000 and 2003 by supporters of Atlas F.C. to former Atlas goalkeeper, Oswaldo Sánchez, no primary sources exist that support this claim and is an urban legend. The earliest documented usage of puto being chanted by fans in this manner occurred on 22 May 2004, during the second leg of the Clausura 2004 repechage match between Cruz Azul and C.F. Pachuca. Fans of Pachuca repeatedly chanted puto every time Óscar Pérez performed a goal kick.

Sanctions
Due to the homophobic meaning of the word puto in Mexican Spanish (a vulgar term for a male prostitute), the chant received negative attention in the 2014 FIFA World Cup. Mexico's fans defended it as being traditionally used in the Liga MX. On 23 June 2014, FIFA dropped an investigation, concluding that the chant "was not considered insulting in the specific context". Football Against Racism in Europe, an anti-discrimination organization, criticized the ruling as "disappointing". In 2017, in advance of the 2018 World Cup, FIFA fined the Mexico football federation over fans' use of the chant and introduced escalating sanctions, which were first applied in Liga MX games in 2019. In 2021, three Mexico international matches in the United States were halted because of fan behaviour, including the CONCACAF Nations League final, in which fans also threw things onto the pitch and Giovanni Reyna was hit in the face by a heavy object. On 18 June 2021, FIFA announced that as a penalty for the use of the chant in a pre-Olympics tournament in Guadalajara, spectators would be barred from Mexico's first two qualifying matches for the 2022 World Cup.

Rivalries

United States 

Mexico and the United States are widely considered as the two top teams in CONCACAF. Matches between the two nations often attracts media attention, public interest and discourse in both countries. Although the first match was played in 1934, their rivalry was not considered major until the late 1990s, when the USA emerged as a solid international side. On 15 August 2012, the United States defeated Mexico at Estadio Azteca in the first victory for the U.S. against Mexico on Mexican soil in 75 years.

Since their first meeting in 1934, the two teams have met 73 times, with Mexico leading the overall series 36–22–15 (W–L–D), outscoring the U.S. 144–82. Mexico dominated in early years, with a 22-2-2 record through 1980.  However, since that time the series has become much more competitive, largely due to the rapid growth of soccer in the United States. Since 2000, the series has favored the U.S. 17–9–6 (W–L–D), with Mexico outscored 32-40. Since 2011, however, the rivalry has been marked by Mexican success, with the Mexicans defeating the United States in the CONCACAF Gold Cup Final in 2011 and 2019, the CONCACAF Cup in 2015, winning on American soil for the first time since 1980. In 2021, however, Mexico lost to the United States in both the Nations League final and the Gold Cup final.

Argentina 

Mexico has a rivalry with Argentina, given these two nations are among the most renowned Hispanic nations in the world after Spain. The rivalry is abnormal by the fact it is intercontinental, with Argentina part of CONMEBOL and Mexico part of CONCACAF. This rivalry is more keenly felt by Mexican supporters than Argentines, who typically view Brazil, Uruguay, England and Germany as bigger rivals. Mexico has historically not fared well against Argentina, recording only 4 wins, 15 losses and 12 draws.

Results and fixtures

The following matches have been played within the past 12 months.

2022

2023

Coaching staff

Players

Current squad
The following 34 players were called up for the CONCACAF Nations League matches against Suriname and Jamaica on 23 and 26 March 2023. Héctor Moreno withdrew due to injury and was replaced by Jesús Orozco.

Caps and goals correct as of 30 November 2022, after the match against Saudi Arabia

Recent call-ups
The following players have been called up within the last 12 months.

Notes
COV = The player is not part of the current squad due to has been tested positive for COVID-19
INJ = Not part of the current squad due to injury
PRE = Preliminary squad/standby
SUS = Serving suspension
WD = The player withdrew from the current squad due to non-injury issue

Player records 

Players in bold are still active with Mexico.

Most capped players

Top goalscorers

Competitive record

FIFA World Cup

CONCACAF Gold Cup

CONCACAF Nations League

Copa América

FIFA Confederations Cup

Olympic Games

Head-to-head record 
Main article: Mexico national football team head-to-head record

Honours
Major competitions

FIFA World Cup
 Quarter-finals (2): 1970, 1986
FIFA Confederations Cup
 Champions (1): 1999
 Third place (1): 1995
CONCACAF Championship / Gold Cup
 Champions (11): 1965, 1971, 1977, 1993, 1996, 1998, 2003, 2009, 2011, 2015, 2019
 Runners-up (3): 1967, 2007, 2021
 Third place (5): 1973, 1981, 1991, 2013, 2017
CONCACAF Nations League
 Runners-up (1): 2019–20
Copa América
 Runners-up (2): 1993, 2001
 Third place (3): 1997, 1999, 2007

Other competitions

Panamerican Championship
 Third place (1): 1960
Central American and Caribbean Games
 Champions (2): 1935, 1938
CONCACAF Cup
 Champions (1): 2015
CONCACAF Olympic Qualifying Tournament
 Champions (3): 1964, 1972, 1976
U.S. Cup
 Champions (3): 1996, 1997, 1999
 Third place (2): 1995, 2000
Marlboro Cup
 Champions (1): 1989
NAFC Championship / North American Nations Cup
 Champions (3): 1947, 1949, 1991
 Runners-up (1): 1990
Lunar New Year Cup
 Champions (1): 1999
 Runners-up (1): 2000

FIFA World Ranking

Last update was on 25 August 2022. 

Source:

 Best Ranking   Worst Ranking   Best Mover   Worst Mover

See also
 Mexico national under-23 football team
 Mexico national under-20 football team
 Mexico national under-17 football team
 Mexico women's national football team
 Mexico national beach football team
 Mexico national futsal team

Notes

References

External links

 
Mexico – FIFA profile
Archives and results at the RSSSF

 
FIFA Confederations Cup-winning countries
North American national association football teams